The 38th annual Berlin International Film Festival was held from 12 to 23 February 1988. The festival opened with musical film Linie 1 by Reinhard Hauff. The Golden Bear was awarded to the Chinese film Red Sorghum directed by Zhang Yimou.

The retrospective was dedicated to colour films and it was titled The History of Colour Film. Originally West German actor Gert Fröbe was selected as Jury President but later he had to decline due to illness, after which Moritz de Hadeln appointed the Italian film critic Guglielmo Biraghi as the Jury President.

Jury
The following people were announced as being on the jury for the festival:
 Guglielmo Biraghi, journalist and film critic (Italy) - Jury President
 Ellen Burstyn, actress (United States)
 Heiner Carow, director and screenwriter (East Germany)
 Eberhard Junkersdorf, producer (West Germany)
 Tom Luddy, producer and co-founder of the Telluride Film Festival (United States)
 Heinz Rathsack, film historian (West Germany)
 Daniel Schmid, director and screenwriter (Switzerland)
 Andrei Smirnov, actor and director (Soviet Union)
 Tilda Swinton, actress (United Kingdom)
 Anna-Lena Wibom, producer and actress (Sweden)
 Pavlos Zannas, writer and film critic (Greece)

Films in competition
The following films were in competition for the Golden Bear:

Out of competition
 Něco z Alenky, directed by Jan Švankmajer (Czechoslovakia, United Kingdom)
 Больше света Bol'se sveta!, directed by Marina Babak (Soviet Union)
 Hail! Hail! Rock 'n' Roll, directed by Taylor Hackford (USA)
 Cry Freedom, directed by Richard Attenborough (United Kingdom)
 Empire of the Sun, director Steven Spielberg (USA)
 Linie 1, directed by Reinhard Hauff (West Germany)
 Little Dorrit, directed by Christine Edzard (UK)
 Nuts, directed by Martin Ritt (USA)
 Powaqqatsi: Life in Transformation, directed by Godfrey Reggio (USA)
 September, directed by Woody Allen (USA)
 История Аси Клячиной, которая любила, да не вышла замуж Istoriya Asi Klyachinoy, kotoraya lyubila, da ne vyshla zamuzh, directed by Andrei Konchalovsky (Soviet Union)

Key
{| class="wikitable" width="550" colspan="1"
| style="background:#FFDEAD;" align="center"| †
|Winner of the main award for best film in its section
|-
| colspan="2"| The opening and closing films are screened during the opening and closing ceremonies respectively.
|}

Retrospective

The following films were shown in the retrospective titled "The History of Colour Film":

Awards

The following prizes were awarded by the Jury:
 Golden Bear: Red Sorghum by Zhang Yimou
 Silver Bear – Special Jury Prize: Komissar by Aleksandr Askoldov
 Silver Bear for Best Director: Norman Jewison for Moonstruck
 Silver Bear for Best Actress: Holly Hunter for Broadcast News
 Silver Bear for Best Actor: Manfred Möck and Jörg Pose for Einer trage des anderen Last
 Silver Bear for an outstanding single achievement: Matka Królów by Janusz Zaorski
 Silver Bear for an outstanding artistic contribution: La deuda interna by Miguel Pereira
FIPRESCI Award
Komissar by Aleksandr Askoldov

References

External links
38th Berlin International Film Festival 1988
1988 Berlin International Film Festival
Berlin International Film Festival:1988 at Internet Movie Database

38
1988 film festivals
1988 in West Germany
1980s in West Berlin
Berl
Berlin